East Timor Women Australia (ETWA) is a grassroots non-government organisation established to support women in East Timor.

East Timorese Tais 

A key focus of support is in assisting women's sustainable livelihoods in the handcrafts industry. ETWA partners with local organisations the Taibesi Cooperative and Cooperativa Tais Timor (CTT). These organisations source tais, the traditional East Timorese weavings, from rural and urban weaving groups. The weaving of tais requires a great deal of skill with designs having a deeply embedded cultural meaning. Designs are passed down from mother to daughter with great variation across the country.

Tais are woven on back-strap looms where a harness sits on the lower back providing tension. Traditionally tais were made from locally sourced and spun cotton although many weavers have incorporated imported cotton into their designs. Many East Timorese organisations such as CTT and Taibesi are also incorporating tais into other product design in order to access broader markets for their products.

ETWA supports the handcrafts industry as a mechanism which allows women to support themselves while maintaining their cultural heritage. With high rates of domestic violence in East Timor economic empowerment may be one way to further strengthen women's social role and opportunities. It also allows the many women widowed or orphaned under the Indonesian occupation with a means of supporting themselves while recognising their highly specialised skills and expertise.

The Organisation 

ETWA is a member-based organisation that is run by volunteers with support by a part-time coordinator. It was established in 2004 by a group of community development students, some of whom were active in the Free East Timor movement before the 1999 referendum.  As well as its Melbourne based office ETWA also has chapters active in the Dandenong Ranges, Gippsland and the Northern Territory. The organisation is self-funded by membership fees, donations and fundraising activities.

Activities 

In addition to supporting CTT and the Taibesi Cooperative to find markets overseas ETWA undertakes other activities. Currently these include developing a program for social justice education in schools, a design collaboration with students from the University of New South Wales and community advocacy. In 2005 ETWA cooperated with the Royal Melbourne Institute of Technology Globalism Institute to hold the Challenges and Possibilities conference which facilitated dialogue between organisations working with women in East Timor. In 2007 ETWA will support a health study into the health of Timorese weavers. The organisation also has a very strong relationship with the Dili-based Cooperative Studies Centre.

ETWA is cited in the book Reluctant Saviour by activist-historian Clinton Fernandes as an example of positive collaboration for sustainable development in East Timor.

See also 
 Women in East Timor

External links
 ETWA website
 Online Tais Museum 

Women in East Timor
Australia–East Timor relations